The Gaston Islands are two islands and off-lying rocks  northwest of the tip of Reclus Peninsula, off the west coast of the Antarctic Peninsula. They were first charted in 1898 by the Belgian Antarctic Expedition under Lieutenant Adrien de Gerlache, who named one of the islands for his brother Gaston. The name was extended to apply to the entire group by the UK Antarctic Place-Names Committee in 1960.

See also 
 List of Antarctic and sub-Antarctic islands

References

Islands of Graham Land
Danco Coast